Galela (or actually Soa Sio, as it is called properly, with the name Galela referring to the entire district/kecamatan surrounding it), is a small town on the eastern Indonesian island of Halmahera. It is located in the North Halmahera Regency, part of the province of North Maluku. Views of Mount Tarakani can be seen from the scenic coast. Galelarese constitutes an official ethnic group in North Halmhera and is also a language, spoken in the Galela region, neighboring parts of Tobelo and Loloda districts, on the island of Morotai and in villages scattered in southern Halmahera as well as on Bacan and Obi. The town borders Lake Galela.

It is served by Gamar Malamo Airport (IATA: GLX). During 2015 Susi Air flies from Ternate every Thursday morning.

References

Populated places in North Maluku